Olga Pakalović (born 8 November 1978) is a Croatian actress. She has appeared in more than twenty films since 1993.

Filmography

Films

References

External links 

1978 births
Living people
Actresses from Zagreb
Croatian film actresses
Golden Arena winners